Phebalium drummondii is a species of small shrub that is endemic to Western Australia. It has smooth branchlets covered with silvery scales, broadly elliptic to egg-shaped leaves with silvery scales on the lower side and bright yellow flowers arranged in umbers on the ends of branchlets.

Description
Its branchlets are smooth and covered with silvery, scale-like hairs. The upper surface is smooth and the lower surface is covered with silvery scales. The flowers are bright yellow and borne in umbels of three to six. Flowering occurs from July to September.

Taxonomy and naming
Phebalium drummondii was first formally described in 1863 by George Bentham in Flora Australiensis from specimens collected by James Drummond.

Distribution and habitat
This phebalium grows in shrubland on flats and roadsides in the Merredin and Newdegate districts.

Conservation status
This phebalium is classified as "Priority Three" by the Government of Western Australia Department of Parks and Wildlife meaning that it is poorly known and known from only a few locations but is not under imminent threat.

References

drummondii
Flora of Western Australia
Plants described in 1863
Taxa named by George Bentham